Patricia "Pat" Jackson (born March 17, 1958) is a former American sprinter.

In 1979 she won at the Pan American Games in San Juan bronze in the 400 metres and gold in the 4 × 400 metres relay. At the 1979 IAAF World Cup she placed seventh in the 400 metres and third in the 4 × 400 metres relay.

External links 
 Profile at trackfield.brinkster.net

1958 births
Living people
American female sprinters
Athletes (track and field) at the 1979 Pan American Games
Pan American Games track and field athletes for the United States
Pan American Games medalists in athletics (track and field)
Pan American Games gold medalists for the United States
Pan American Games bronze medalists for the United States
Medalists at the 1979 Pan American Games
21st-century American women
20th-century American women